SFFC may refer to:

South Fremantle Football Club
Sporting Fingal F.C.
Supercat Fast Ferry Corporation
Swanley Furness F.C.
Société financière française et coloniale